Ptilotus macrocephalus (commonly as featherheads, green mulla mulla or green pussytails) is a native Australian perennial herb growing up to  high. The species was originally described as Trichinium macrocephalum by Robert Brown in 1810 based on specimens from Victoria, Australia. In 1816, it was first transferred to the genus Ptilotus by Jean Louis Marie Poiret. While once considered distributed throughout most of the Australian mainland, current research limits the distribution of P. macrocephalus to south-eastern Australia, mostly in south-eastern South Australia, Victoria and New South Wales. A study by Hammer et al. (2019) determined that specimens previously identified as P. macrocephalus are morphologically and ecologically distinct species, the now named Ptilotus xerophilus T.Hammer & R.W.Davis (arid central and western Australia) and Ptilotus psilorhachis T.Hammer & R.W.Davis (eastern Queensland).

P. macrocephalus has cream-green coloured ovoid flower heads. As with other green-flowered Ptilotus species (e.g. Ptilotus nobilis), they are thought to be predominantly pollinated by nocturnal moths.

References

macrocephalus
Flora of New South Wales
Flora of South Australia
Flora of Queensland
Flora of Victoria (Australia)